The High Commissioner of New Zealand to Malaysia is the head of New Zealand's diplomatic mission to Malaysia. The position has the rank and status of an Ambassador Extraordinary and Plenipotentiary and is based in the High Commission of New Zealand, Kuala Lumpur.

New Zealand has maintained a resident High Commissioner in Malaysia since the country's formation in 1963. The High Commissioner to Malaysia is concurrently accredited to Brunei Darussalam.

As fellow members of the Commonwealth of Nations, diplomatic relations between New Zealand and Malaysia are at governmental level, rather than between Heads of State. Thus, the countries exchange High Commissioners, rather than ambassadors.

List of heads of mission

High Commissioners to Malaya

High Commissioners to Malaysia
 Hunter Wade (1963–1967)
 Doug Zohrab (1967–1969)
 Dick Hutchens (1969–1973)
 Jim Weir (1973–1977)
 Jack Shepherd (1977–1979)
 Michael Mansfield (1979–1982)
 Harle Freeman-Greene (1982–1985)
 Ray Jermyn (1985–1990)
 Michael Chilton (1990–1994)
 Tim Hannah (1994–1997)
 Sarah Dennis (1997–2001)
 Mac Price (2001–2003)
 Geoff Randal (2003 - 2006)
  David Kersey (2006 - 2011)
 David Pine (2011 - 2014)
 John Subritzky (2015 - 2018)
 Hunter Nottage (2019 - 2020)
 Pam Dunn (2020 - )

See also
 Malaysia–New Zealand relations

References
 Heads of Missions List: M.  New Zealand Ministry of Foreign Affairs and Trade.  Retrieved on 2006-07-08.

Malaysia, High Commissioners from New Zealand to
 
New Zealand